The 4th annual Venice International Film Festival was held between 10 and 31 August 1936. This year saw an international jury nominated for the first time.

Jury
 Giuseppe Volpi di Misurata (president) (Italy)
 Neville Kearney (UK)
 Oswald Lehnich (Germany)
 Karl Meltzer (Germany)
 Ryszard Ordynski (Poland)
 Louis Villani (Hungary)
 Émile Vuillermoz (France)
 Luigi Freddi (Italy)
 Mario Gromo (Italy)
 Antonio Maraini (Italy)
 Giacomo Paolucci de Calboli Barone (Italy)
 Filippo Sacchi (Italy)
 Ottavio Croze (Italy)

In-Competition films
 La Kermesse héroïque by Jacques Feyder
 Der Kaiser von Kalifornien by Luis Trenker
 The Ghost Goes West by René Clair
 The Great Ziegfeld by Robert Z. Leonard
 Lo squadrone bianco by Augusto Genina
 Mayerling by Anatole Litvak
 Mr. Deeds Goes to Town by Frank Capra
 Show Boat by James Whale
 The Story of Louis Pasteur by William Dieterle
 Veille d'armes by Marcel L'Herbier

Awards
 Best Foreign Film: Der Kaiser von Kalifornien by Luis Trenker
 Best Italian Film: Lo squadrone bianco by Augusto Genina
 Volpi Cup:
 Best Actor: Paul Muni for The Story of Louis Pasteur
 Best Actress: Annabella for Veille d'armes
 Special Recommendation:
 Ave Maria by Johannes Riemann
 Children's Corner by Marcel L'Herbier, Emile Vuillermoz
 Mary of Scotland by John Ford
 Marysa by Josef Rovenský
 Metropolitan Nocturne by Leigh Jason
 Mr. Deeds Goes to Town by Frank Capra
 Opernring by Carmine Gallone
 Polesie by Maksymilian Emmer, Jerzy Maliniak
 Pompei by Giorgio Ferroni
 Scrooge by Henry Edwards
 The Mine by J. B. Holmes
 The Robber Symphony by Friedrich Feher
 Verräter by Karl Ritter
 Animated Film: Who Killed Cock Robin? by Walt Disney
 Color Film: The Trail of the Lonesome Pine by Henry Hathaway
 Best Director: La Kermesse héroïque by Jacques Feyder
 Best Cinematography: Tudor Rose by Mutz Greenbaum

References

External links 

Venice Film Festival 1936 Awards on IMDb

V
Venice Film Festival
1936 film festivals
Film
August 1936 events